Jianzhong Zhang is an electrical engineer with Samsung Research America in Mountain View, California. He was named a Fellow of the Institute of Electrical and Electronics Engineers (IEEE) in 2016 for his leadership in the standardization of cellular systems.

References

Fellow Members of the IEEE
Living people
Year of birth missing (living people)
Place of birth missing (living people)